The Solomons Temple Islands (variants: Solomon's Temple Islands; Solomons Temple Island) are an uninhabited Canadian arctic islands group located within the midsection of James Bay in Nunavut, Canada. They are situated north of Charlton Island, and southwest of Paint Hills Islands, Pointe au Huard and Andrew Moar Bay,

History
In 1950, Thomas Henry Manning studied unusually high tide driftwood strand lines on Solomons Temple's northern exposed beach.

References

Uninhabited islands of Qikiqtaaluk Region
Islands of James Bay